The 2004–05 Wisconsin Badgers women's ice hockey team was the Badgers' 5th season. Their record in the WCHA was 20-7-1.

Regular season

Schedule

Awards and honors
Molly Engstrom, AHCA All-Americans (First Team)
Molly Engstrom, Patty Kazmaier Award Top-10 Finalist
Molly Engstrom, WCHA Defensive Player of the Year
Carla MacLeod, AHCA All-Americans (Second Team)
Carla MacLeod, Big Ten Medal of Honor
Carla MacLeod, Patty Kazmaier Award Top-10 Finalist
Carla MacLeod, 2004-05 USCHO.com Defensive Player of the Year

All-WCHA honors
Sara Bauer, F, Second team
Molly Engstrom, D, First Team
Carla MacLeod, F, Second team
Jinelle Zaugg, F, WCHA All–Rookie team

WCHA Player of the Week
Sara Bauer, Week of Feb. 7, 2005
Carla MacLeod, Week of Dec. 13, 2004
Lindsay Macy, Week of Oct. 11, 2004
Nicole Uliasz, Week of Nov. 22, 2004

Team awards
Sara Bauer, Offensive Player of the Year Award
Sharon Cole, Badger Award (Most Inspirational Player award)
Molly Engstrom and Carla MacLeod, Defensive Player of the Year Award
Carla MacLeod, W Club Community Service Award
Phoebe Monteleone, Jeff Sauer Award (the player who consistently demonstrates dedication to her teammates)
Emily Morris and Jinelle Zaugg, Rookie of the Year

References

Wisconsin
Wisconsin Badgers women's ice hockey seasons
Wiscon
Wiscon